Lady Macbeth is a leading character in William Shakespeare's tragedy Macbeth. As the wife of the play's tragic hero, Macbeth (a Scottish nobleman), Lady Macbeth goads her husband into committing regicide, after which she becomes queen of Scotland. When she does this, she is regarded as more powerful than Macbeth as she is able to manipulate him into doing what she wants. After Macbeth becomes a murderous tyrant, she is driven to madness by guilt over their crimes, and commits suicide offstage.

Lady Macbeth is a powerful presence in the play, most notably in the first two acts. Following the murder of King Duncan, however, her role in the plot diminishes. She becomes an uninvolved spectator to Macbeth's plotting and a nervous hostess at a banquet dominated by her husband's hallucinations. Her sleepwalking scene in the fifth act is a turning point in the play, and her line "Out, damned spot!" has become a phrase familiar to many speakers of the English language. The report of her death late in the fifth act provides the inspiration for Macbeth's "Tomorrow and tomorrow and tomorrow" speech.

The role has attracted countless notable actors over the centuries, including Sarah Siddons, Charlotte Melmoth, Helen Faucit, Ellen Terry, Jeanette Nolan, Vivien Leigh, Simone Signoret, Vivien Merchant, Glenda Jackson, Francesca Annis, Judith Anderson, Judi Dench, Renee O'Connor, Helen McCrory, Keeley Hawes, Alex Kingston, Marion Cotillard, Hannah Taylor-Gordon, Frances McDormand and Saoirse Ronan.

Origins

Shakespeare's Lady Macbeth appeared to be a composite of two personages found in the account of King Duff and in the account of King Duncan in Holinshed's Chronicles: Donwald's nagging, murderous wife in the account of King Duff and Macbeth's ambitious wife, Gruoch of Scotland, in the account of King Duncan. In the account of King Duff, one of his captains, Donwald, suffers the deaths of his kinsmen at the orders of the king. Donwald then considers regicide at "the setting on of his wife", who "showed him the means whereby he might soonest accomplish it." Donwald abhors such an act, but perseveres at the nagging of his wife. After plying the king's servants with food and drink and letting them fall asleep, the couple admit their confederates to the king's room, where they then commit the regicide. The murder of Duff has its motivation in revenge rather than ambition.

In Holinshed's account of King Duncan, the discussion of Lady Macbeth is confined to a single sentence:

Role in the play

Lady Macbeth makes her first appearance late in scene five of the first act, when she learns in a letter from her husband that three witches have prophesied his future as king. Aware her husband's  is "too full o' the milk of human kindness" for committing a murder, then, countering her husband's arguments and reminding him that he first broached the matter, finally winning him to her designs.

The king retires after a night of eating. Lady Macbeth drugs his attendants and lies the daggers ready for the commission of the crime. Macbeth kills the sleeping king while Lady Macbeth waits nearby. When he brings the daggers from the king's room, Lady Macbeth orders him to return them to the scene of the crime. He refuses. She carries the daggers to the room and smears the drugged attendants faces with the king's blood. The couple retire to wash their hands.

Following the murder of King Duncan, Lady Macbeth's role in the plots diminish. When Duncan's sons flee the land in fear for their own lives, Macbeth is given king. Without consulting her, Macbeth plots other murders in order to secure his throne, and, at a royal banquet, the queen is forced to dismiss her guests when Macbeth hallucinates.

When Macbeth orders the death of Macduff, his assassins succeed only in killing his wife and children. Lady Macbeth is horrified and wracked with guilt, which drives her to kill herself; in her last appearance, she sleepwalks in profound torment, and hallucinates that her hands are stained with the blood of Duncan and Macduff's family, scrubbing furiously in a vain attempt to "clean" them. She dies off-stage, with suicide being suggested as its cause when Malcolm declares that she died by "self and violent hands."

In the First Folio, the only source for the play, she is never referred to as Lady Macbeth, but variously as "Macbeth's wife", "Macbeth's lady", or just "lady"..

Sleepwalking scene

The sleepwalking scene is one of the more celebrated scenes from Macbeth, and, indeed, in all of Shakespeare. It has no counterpart in Holinshed's Chronicles, Shakespeare's source material for the play, but is solely his invention.

A.C. Bradley notes that, with the exception of its few closing lines, the scene is entirely in prose with Lady Macbeth being the only major character in Shakespearean tragedy to make a last appearance "denied the dignity of verse." According to Bradley, Shakespeare generally assigned prose to characters exhibiting abnormal states of mind or abnormal conditions such as somnambulism, with the regular rhythm of verse being inappropriate to characters having lost their balance of mind or subject to images or impressions with no rational connection. Lady Macbeth's recollections – the blood on her hand, the striking of the clock, her husband's reluctance – are brought forth from her disordered mind in chance order with each image deepening her anguish. For Bradley, Lady Macbeth's "brief toneless sentences seem the only voice of truth" with the spare and simple construction of the character's diction expressing a "desolating misery."

Analyses of the role

Lady Macbeth as anti-mother
Stephanie Chamberlain in her article "Fantasizing Infanticide: Lady Macbeth and the Murdering Mother in Early Modern England" argues that though Lady Macbeth wants power, her power is "conditioned on maternity", which was a "conflicted status in early modern England". Chamberlain argues that the negative images of Lady Macbeth as a mother figure, such as when she discusses her ability to "dash the brains" of the babe that sucks her breast, reflect controversies concerning the image of motherhood in early modern England. In early modern England, mothers were often accused of hurting the people that were placed in their hands. Lady Macbeth then personifies all mothers of early modern England who were condemned for Lady Macbeth's fantasy of infanticide. Lady Macbeth's fantasy, Chamberlain argues, is not struggling to be a man, but rather struggling with the condemnation of being a bad mother that was common during that time.

Jenijoy La Belle takes a slightly different view in her article, "A Strange Infirmity: Lady Macbeth’s Amenorrhea". La Belle states that Lady Macbeth does not wish for just a move away from femininity; she is asking the spirits to eliminate the basic biological characteristics of womanhood. The main biological characteristic that La Belle focuses on is menstruation. La Belle argues that by asking to be "unsex[ed]" and crying out to spirits to "make thick [her] blood / Stop up th' access and passage to remorse", Lady Macbeth asks for her menstrual cycle to stop. By having her menstrual cycle stop, Lady Macbeth hopes to stop any feelings of sensitivity and caring that is associated with females. She hopes to become like a man to stop any sense of remorse for the regicide. La Belle furthers her argument by connecting the stopping of the menstrual cycle with the persistent infanticide motifs in the play. La Belle gives examples of "the strangled babe" whose finger is thrown into the witches' cauldron (4.1.30); Macduff's babes who are "savagely slaughter’d" (4.3.235); and the suckling babe with boneless gums whose brains Lady Macbeth would dash out (1.7.57–58) to argue that Lady Macbeth represents the ultimate anti-mother: not only would she smash in a baby's brains but she would go even further to stop her means of procreation altogether.

Lady Macbeth as a witch
Some literary critics and historians argue that not only does Lady Macbeth represent an anti-mother figure in general, she also embodies a specific type of anti-mother: the witch. Modern day critic Joanna Levin defines a witch as a woman who succumbs to Satanic force, a lust for the devil, and who, either for this reason or the desire to obtain supernatural powers, invokes (evil) spirits. Levin refers to Marianne Hester's Lewd Women and Wicked Witches: A Study of Male Domination, in which Hester articulates a feminist interpretation of the witch as an empowered woman. Levin summarises the claim of feminist historians like Hester: the witch should be a figure celebrated for her nonconformity, defiance, and general sense of empowerment; witches challenged patriarchal authority and hierarchy, specifically "threatening hegemonic sex/gender systems". This view associates witchcraft – and by extension, Lady Macbeth – not with villainy and evil, but with heroism.

Literary scholar Jenijoy La Belle assesses Lady Macbeth's femininity and sexuality as they relate to motherhood as well as witchhood. The fact that she conjures spirits likens her to a witch, and the act itself establishes a similarity in the way that both Lady Macbeth and the Weird Sisters from the play "use the metaphoric powers of language to call upon spiritual powers who in turn will influence physical events – in one case the workings of the state, in the other the workings of a woman's body." Like the witches, Lady Macbeth strives to make herself an instrument for bringing about the future.

She proves herself a defiant, empowered nonconformist, and an explicit threat to a patriarchal system of governance in that, through challenging his masculinity, she manipulates Macbeth into murdering King Duncan. Despite the fact that she calls him a coward, Macbeth remains reluctant, until she asks: "What beast was't, then, that made you break this enterprise to me? / When you durst do it, then you were a man; / And to be more than what you were, you would / Be so much more the man." Thus Lady Macbeth enforces a masculine conception of power, yet only after pleading to be unsexed, or defeminised.

Performance history
John Rice, a boy actor with the King's Men, may have played Lady Macbeth in a performance of what was likely Shakespeare's tragedy at the Globe Theatre on 20 April 1611. The performance was witnessed and described by Simon Forman in his manuscript The Book of Plays and Notes thereof per Formans for Common Policy. His account, however, does not establish whether the play was Shakespeare's Macbeth or a work on the same subject by another dramatist. The role may have been beyond the talents of a boy actor and may have been played by a man in early performances.

In the mid-18th century, Hannah Pritchard played Lady Macbeth opposite David Garrick's Macbeth. She was, in Thomas Davies' words, "insensible to compunction and inflexibly bent on cruelty."

Sarah Siddons starred in John Philip Kemble's 1794 production at the Theatre Royal, Drury Lane and offered a psychologically intricate portrait of Lady Macbeth in the tradition of Hannah Pritchard. Siddons was especially praised for moving audiences in the sleepwalking scene with her depiction of a soul in profound torment. Siddons and Kemble furthered the view established by Pritchard and Garrick that character was the essence of Shakespearean drama.

William Hazlitt commented on Siddons' performance:

Helen Faucit was critiqued by Henry Morley, a professor of English literature in University College, London, who thought the actress "too demonstrative and noisy" in the scenes before Duncan's murder with the "Come, you spirits" speech "simply spouted" and its closing "Hold! Hold!" shouted in a "most unheavenly manner." In the "I have given suck" speech, he thought Faucit "poured out" the speech in a way that recalled the "scold at the door of a gin-shop." Faucit, he believed, was "too essentially feminine, too exclusively gifted with the art of expressing all that is most beautiful and graceful in womanhood, to succeed in inspiring anything like awe and terror." He thought her talents more congenial to the second phase of the character, and found her "admirably good" in the banquet scene. Her sleepwalking scene, however, was described as having "the air of a too well-studied dramatic recitation."

In 1884 at the Gaiety Theatre, Sarah Bernhardt performed the sleepwalking scene barefoot and clad in a clinging nightdress, and, in 1888, a critic noted Ellen Terry was "the stormy dominant woman of the eleventh century equipped with the capricious emotional subtlety of the nineteenth century."

In 1915 and 1918, Sybil Thorndike played the role at Old Vic and then at the Prince's Theatre in 1926. Flora Robson played the role in Tyrone Guthrie's Old Vic production in 1934. In 1955, Vivien Leigh played Lady Macbeth opposite Laurence Olivier at the Shakespeare Memorial Theatre in Stratford-upon-Avon. In 1977 at The Other Place in Stratford, Judi Dench and Ian McKellen played the infamous husband and wife in Trevor Nunn's production. Other notable Lady Macbeths in the late 20th century included Judith Anderson, Pamela Brown, Diana Wynyard, Simone Signoret, Vivien Merchant, Jane Lapotaire, Maggie Smith, Helen Mirren and Janet Suzman.

Jeanette Nolan performed the role in Orson Welles' 1948 film adaptation and was critiqued by Bosley Crowther in the New York Times of 28 December 1950: "The Lady Macbeth of Jeanette Nolan is a pop-eyed and haggard dame whose driving determination is as vagrant as the highlights on her face. Likewise, her influence upon Macbeth, while fleetingly suggested in a few taut lines and etched in a couple of hot embraces, is not developed adequately. The passion and torment of the conflict between these two which resides in the play has been rather seriously neglected in this truncated rendering." Michael Costello of Allmovie has described her performance as "uneven" and has also stated, "Her unique Lady Macbeth is either an exhibition of rank scenery-chewing or a performance of intriguingly Kabuki-like stylization."

In 2001, actress Maura Tierney portrayed a modernized version of Lady MacBeth in the satirical film Scotland, PA.

In 2009, Pegasus Books published The Tragedy of Macbeth Part II, a play by American author and playwright Noah Lukeman, which endeavoured to offer a sequel to Macbeth and to resolve its many loose ends, particularly Lady Macbeth's reference to her having had a child (which, historically, she did - from a previous marriage, having remarried Macbeth after being widowed.) Written in blank verse, the play was published to critical acclaim.

In 2010, Gloria Carreño's play "A Season Before The Tragedy of Macbeth" was produced by British Touring Shakespeare and received the plaudits of critics for "its amazing grasp of language". It was deemed "a feat" and a must-see for fans of Shakespeare. The dramatist Gloria Carreño describes events from the murder of "Lord Gillecomgain", Gruoch Macduff's first husband, to the fateful letter in the first act of Shakespeare's tragedy.

Alex Kingston starred as Lady Macbeth opposite Kenneth Branagh in his and Rob Ashford's adaption of Macbeth. The play was first performed at the Manchester Festival in 2013 and then transferred to New York for a limited engagement in 2014.

Marion Cotillard played the character in Justin Kurzel's 2015 film adaptation opposite Michael Fassbender as Macbeth.

Frances McDormand played the character in The Tragedy of Macbeth opposite Denzel Washington as Macbeth directed by her husband Joel Coen, the first film directed without his brother Ethan Coen.

In popular culture

 During former United States President Bill Clinton's 1992 campaign for the American presidency, Daniel Wattenberg's August 1992 The American Spectator article "The Lady Macbeth of Little Rock", and some twenty other articles in major publications drew comparisons between his wife and Lady Macbeth, questioning Hillary Clinton's ideological and ethical record in comparison to Shakespeare's famous character and suggesting parallels.
 The Simpsons twentieth episode of its twentieth season, "Four Great Women and a Manicure" is loosely based on Macbeth. In the third act of the episode, Marge embodies Lady Macbeth, an ambitious wife who is frustrated by everything around her. She not only has to clean the costumes worn by other actors, but is also frustrated over the fact that Homer doesn't have any interest in auditioning for lead roles and would rather play a tree. She convinces him to kill Sideshow Mel and he does to assume the lead role of Macbeth. When Marge learns that no one cares for Homer's lack of acting skills over Hibbert's and those with no lines, she forces him to kill off everyone else until he's the only actor left. The angry spirits visit her that night and she tries to pin the blame on Homer. They refuse to believe Marge and point out that they knew he was a victim himself in her devious ambitions. The angry spirits get their revenge on her by killing her in a fright induced heart attack. Even though Homer gives Marge's ghost a promising performance, he eventually frustrates her more by killing himself so he doesn't have to audition for more Shakespearean plays. This forces Marge to learn her lesson the hard way when she must spend eternity with a lazy and happy Homer.
 In 2008, Three Rivers Press published Lady Macbeth by Susan Fraser King. The novel is original fiction, based on source material regarding the period and person of Lady Macbeth.
 Julia Gillard was compared to Lady Macbeth after she ousted Kevin Rudd as Prime Minister of Australia in June 2010. The most often cited parallels between Gillard and Lady Macbeth were that Gillard was a red-haired and 'deliberately barren' woman, while the event itself occurred late in the evening, much like King Duncan's murder. Additionally, the perpetrator succeeded the victim, Julia Gillard became the Prime Minister after "killing" Kevin Rudd's career while the Macbeths were proclaimed King and Queen after King Duncan's death. Additional parallels to the play Macbeth, more broadly, include the fact that Gillard was labelled a witch, was the recipient of misogynistic attitudes, and Gillard's statement to Senator Kim Carr that the Labor Government was sleepwalking to defeat.

Many have compared Gisele Barreto Fetterman, the wife of Pennsylvania Senator   John Fetterman to Lady Macbeth.

See also
 What's done is done

References

Further reading
 Lady MacBeth and the Daemonologie of Hysteria
 Some Character-Types Met with in Psycho-Analytic Work
 Women's Fantasy of Manhood: A Shakespearian Theme
  - Posted on the website of the Wallingford-Swarthmore School District

External links
 Macbeth: Folio Version
 Macbeth: Full-text online
 List of all appearances and all mentions of Lady Macbeth in the play.

Female Shakespearean characters
Fictional queens
Fictional lords and ladies
Fictional characters based on real people
Characters in Macbeth
Fictional Scottish people
Fictional suicides
Literary characters introduced in 1603
Female literary villains
Female characters in literature
Fictional regicides
Shakespeare villains